Nepenthes veitchii (after James Veitch, nurseryman of the Veitch Nurseries), or Veitch's pitcher-plant, is a Nepenthes species from the island of Borneo. The plant is widespread in north-western Borneo and can also be found in parts of Kalimantan. It grows in lowland Dipterocarp forest, typically near rivers, and on ridgetops in mossy forests, from 0 to 1,600 meters elevation.  Nepenthes veitchii usually grows as an epiphyte, though the form from Bario seems to be strictly terrestrial and has not been observed to climb trees.

Frederick William Burbidge described the growth habit of N. veitchii in The Gardeners' Chronicle as follows:

Now as to N. Veitchii. This is a true epiphyte. I never met with it on the ground anywhere, but in great quantity 20—100 feet high on tree trunks. Its distichous habit is unique, I fancy, and then some of the leaves actually clasp around the tree just as a man would fold his arms around it in similar circumstances. No other species of Nepenthes, so far as I know, has this habit.

Odoardo Beccari found N. veitchii on the top of Mount Santubong in 1865. He wrote the following account of his discovery:

This is one of the finest and rarest of all pitcher-plants. ... Some of the specimens I got measured quite ten inches in length. The mouth of the pitcher in this species is certainly its most conspicuous and remarkable part by reason of its rich orange colour and its vertical position. It is also a perfect trap to entice insects into its interior, attracting them from a distance by its bright colours. Sir Joseph Hooker compares the mouth of the pitchers of N. veitchii to the gills of a fish, to which, indeed, with their narrow lamellae converging to the centre, they bear considerable resemblance.

Nepenthes veitchii is thought to be closely related to N. robcantleyi from the Philippines. It has also been compared to N. truncata.

Infraspecific taxa
The following infraspecific taxa of N. veitchii have been described. Both are nomina nuda and are not considered valid today.

Nepenthes veitchii f. barioensis Hort. ex Y.Fukatsu (1999) nom.nud.
Nepenthes veitchii var. striata Hort.Veitch (1892) nom.nud.

Natural hybrids
The following natural hybrids involving N. veitchii have been recorded.

N. albomarginata × N. veitchii
N. chaniana × N. veitchii
? N. faizaliana × N. veitchii
N. fusca × N. veitchii [=?N. hurrelliana]
N. hurrelliana × N. veitchii [=?(N. fusca × N. veitchii) × N. veitchii]
N. lowii × N. veitchii
N. stenophylla × N. veitchii

References

Further reading

 [Anonymous] 1881. Messrs. Veitch's Nepenthes-house. The Gardeners' Chronicle, new series, 16(410): 598–599.
 [Anonymous] 1881. New garden plants. Nepenthes Veitchii, Hook. f.. The Gardeners' Chronicle, new series, 16(416): 780–781.
 [Anonymous] 1883. Mr. A. E. Ratcliff's Nepenthes. The Gardeners' Chronicle 20(497): 18–19. 
 [Anonymous] 1887. Nepenthes at Messrs. Veitch's, Chelsea. The Gardeners' Chronicle, series 3, 2(41): 438.
 Adam, J.H., C.C. Wilcock & M.D. Swaine 1992.  Journal of Tropical Forest Science 5(1): 13–25.
 Adam, J.H. & C.C. Wilcock 1999.  Pertanika Journal of Tropical Agricultural Science 22(1): 1–7.
  André, E. 1876. Nepenthes Veitchi, J. D. Hook.. L'Illustration horticole: revue mensuelle des serres et des jardins 23: 192–193, t. 261.
 Bauer, U., C.J. Clemente, T. Renner & W. Federle 2012. Form follows function: morphological diversification and alternative trapping strategies in carnivorous Nepenthes pitcher plants. Journal of Evolutionary Biology 25(1): 90–102. 
 Benz, M.J., E.V. Gorb & S.N. Gorb 2012. Diversity of the slippery zone microstructure in pitchers of nine carnivorous Nepenthes taxa. Arthropod-Plant Interactions 6(1): 147–158. 
 Bourke, G. 2010.  Captive Exotics Newsletter 1(1): 4–7. 
 Bourke, G. 2011. The Nepenthes of Mulu National Park. Carniflora Australis 8(1): 20–31.
 Chung, A.Y.C. 2006. Biodiversity and Conservation of The Meliau Range: A Rain Forest in Sabah's Ultramafic Belt. Natural History Publications (Borneo), Kota Kinabalu. .
 Clarke, C.M. 2006. Introduction. In: Danser, B.H. The Nepenthaceae of the Netherlands Indies. Natural History Publications (Borneo), Kota Kinabalu. pp. 1–15.
 De Witte, J. 1996.   Carnivorous Plant Newsletter 25(2): 41–45.
 Dixon, W.E. 1889. Nepenthes. The Gardeners' Chronicle, series 3, 6(144): 354.
Dodd, C. 1990.   Carnivorous Plant Newsletter 19(3-4): 106-108.
 Hansen, E. 2001. Where rocks sing, ants swim, and plants eat animals: finding members of the Nepenthes carnivorous plant family in Borneo. Discover 22(10): 60–68.
  Jarry-Desloges, R. 1903. Variétés nouvelles ou rares de Nepenthes. Le Jardin 17: 72.
 Lee, C.C. 2000. Recent Nepenthes Discoveries. [video] The 3rd Conference of the International Carnivorous Plant Society, San Francisco, USA.
 Lee, C.C. 2002.  Proceedings of the 4th International Carnivorous Plant Conference, Hiroshima University, Tokyo: 25–30.
 Lee, C.C. 2002. Nepenthes species of the Hose Mountains in Sarawak, Borneo. [video] The 4th International Carnivorous Plant Conference, Tokyo, Japan. (video by Irmgard & Siegfried R. H. Hartmeyer)
  Mansur, M. 2001.  In: Prosiding Seminar Hari Cinta Puspa dan Satwa Nasional. Lembaga Ilmu Pengetahuan Indonesia, Bogor. pp. 244–253.
 Moore, D. 1872. On the culture of Nepenthes at Glasnevin. The Gardeners' Chronicle and Agricultural Gazette 1872(11): 359–360.
 Masters, M.T. 1882. New garden plants. Nepenthes rubro-maculata×, Hort. Veitch. The Gardeners' Chronicle, new series, 17(423): 143. 
 Masters, M.T. 1882. New garden plants. Nepenthes lanata. The Gardeners' Chronicle, new series, 17(424): 178.
 McPherson, S.R. & A. Robinson 2012. Field Guide to the Pitcher Plants of Borneo. Redfern Natural History Productions, Poole.
 Meimberg, H., P. Dittrich, G. Bringmann, J. Schlauer & G. Heubl 2000. Molecular phylogeny of Caryophyllidae s.l. based on matK sequences with special emphasis on carnivorous taxa. Plant Biology 2(2): 218–228. 
 Meimberg, H., A. Wistuba, P. Dittrich & G. Heubl 2001. Molecular phylogeny of Nepenthaceae based on cladistic analysis of plastid trnK intron sequence data. Plant Biology 3(2): 164–175. 
  Meimberg, H. 2002.  Ph.D. thesis, Ludwig Maximilian University of Munich, Munich.
 Meimberg, H. & G. Heubl 2006. Introduction of a nuclear marker for phylogenetic analysis of Nepenthaceae. Plant Biology 8(6): 831–840. 
 Meimberg, H., S. Thalhammer, A. Brachmann & G. Heubl 2006. Comparative analysis of a translocated copy of the trnK intron in carnivorous family Nepenthaceae. Molecular Phylogenetics and Evolution 39(2): 478–490. 
 Mey, F.S. 2014. Joined lecture on carnivorous plants of Borneo with Stewart McPherson. Strange Fruits: A Garden's Chronicle, February 21, 2014.
 Miyagi, I. & T. Toma 2007. A new mosquito of the genus Topomyia (Diptera, Culicidae) from a Nepenthes pitcher plant in a Bario highland of Sarawak, Malaysia. Medical Entomology and Zoology 58(3): 167–174. Abstract
  Neubauer, J. 2003. Nepenthes veitchii Hook. F.. Trifid 2003(2): 26–27. (page 2)
 Siegara, A. & Yogiara 2009. Bacterial community profiles in the fluid of four pitcher plant species (Nepenthes spp.) grown in a nursery. Microbiology Indonesia 3(3): 109–114.
 Thorogood, C. 2010. The Malaysian Nepenthes: Evolutionary and Taxonomic Perspectives. Nova Science Publishers, New York.

Carnivorous plants of Asia
veitchii
Endemic flora of Borneo
Plants described in 1859
Veitch Nurseries
Flora of the Borneo lowland rain forests
Flora of the Borneo montane rain forests